Longhui County is a county and the 6th most populous county-level division in the Province of Hunan, China; it is under the administration of Shaoyang City. Located in the mid-eastern Hunan, the county is bordered to the north by Xinhua and Xupu Counties, to the west by Dongkou County, to the south by Wugang City and Shaoyang County, to the east by Xinshao County. The county has 17 towns and seven townships under its jurisdiction, the county seat is Taohong Town. The county was amongst the list of impoverished places of China, and finally got off the poverty list in the early 2000s.

Administrative divisions
17 towns
 Beishan
 Gaoping
 Hengbanqiao
 Hexiangqiao
 Jinshiqiao
 Liuduzhai
 Nanyuemiao
 Qijiang
 Sangesi
 Simenqian
 Tantou
 Taohong
 Xiaoshajiang
 Xiyangjiang
 Yankou
 Yatian
 Zhouwang

5 townships
 Dashuitian
 Hetian
 Luohong
 Matangshan
 Yanggu'ao

2  ethnic townships
 Yao Huxingshan
 Hui Shanjie

Climate

References 

www.xzqh.org

External links

 
County-level divisions of Hunan
Shaoyang